George Stracey Smyth (4 April 1767 – 27 March 1823) was Commander-in-Chief, North America, Lieutenant Governor of Nova Scotia and Lieutenant Governor of New Brunswick.

Biography
Born in England, he was appointed an ensign in the East Norfolk Regiment of Militia in 1779. He joined the army as an ensign in the 25th Foot in 1780. In 1791, as a lieutenant, he served with Prince Edward Augustus, Duke of Kent and Strathearn, the fourth son of George III, in Gibraltar. He would serve on the prince's staff in Gibraltar, Quebec, the West Indies, and Nova Scotia for twelve years. In 1798, he was promoted to major and the following year was the senior aide-de-camp and acting quartermaster general for the Duke of Kent when he became Commander-in-Chief, North America. In 1812, he was promoted to major general. From 1817 to 1823, he was the Lieutenant-Governor of New Brunswick. 

While he was Commander-in-Chief his wife Amelia Ann Smyth (née Cantelo) died and has a memorial to her in St. Paul's Church (Halifax, Nova Scotia).  There is a memorial to him in the church of All Saints, Chelsworth, Suffolk, England that was erected by his brother John Gee Smyth, Rector of Chelsworth, Suffolk and Chaplain to the Prince Edward, Duke of Kent and Strathearn. (His brother John became the guardian of George's children upon his death in 1823.)

References

1767 births
1823 deaths
British Army generals
Governors of the Colony of New Brunswick
King's Own Scottish Borderers officers
Governors of the Colony of Nova Scotia